Relations between the European Union (EU) and Moldova are currently shaped via the European Neighbourhood Policy (ENP), an EU foreign policy instrument dealing with countries bordering its member states.

Moldova has strong ties to EU member state Romania. During the interwar period the two countries were united. They share a common language, traditions and culture. The Moldovan flag is a modified version of the Romanian equivalent, with the Moldovan arms superimposed in its centre. Despite Moldovan nationalist tendencies and a sizable Russophone minority, the Romanians, whilst having no ongoing claim to Moldovan territory per se, see Moldovans as culturally and ethnically Romanian. The former period of union enables Romanian passports and concurrent EU citizenship to be routinely granted to Moldovans on the basis of descent. A proportion of Moldovans currently identify as Romanian (see below).

The level of poverty in Moldova (the country is the poorest among the potential EU members) is a stumbling block to accession. The Transnistria conflict, concerning a self-proclaimed breakaway republic supported by Russia, is also an obstacle.

Nevertheless, the EU is developing an increasingly close relationship with Moldova, going beyond cooperation, to gradual economic integration and a deepening of political cooperation. The EU has opened an office in Chişinău (the Moldovan capital), and on 23 March 2005 appointed Adriaan Jacobovits de Szeged as special representative to Moldova with a focus on the resolution of the crisis in Transnistria. The European Commission opened up a new office in Moldova on 6 October 2005 headed by Cesare de Montis. In June 2021, the European Commission announced Moldova will receive 600 million euros between 2021 and 2024, to help it recover from the COVID-19 pandemic and develop as a country. The major strategic priority of Moldova is now seeking membership in European institutions.

Following the outbreak of the 2022 Russian invasion of Ukraine, President Maia Sandu signed on 3 March 2022 the application for EU membership, together with Igor Grosu, the President of the Moldovan Parliament and Natalia Gavrilița, the Prime Minister of Moldova. On 23 June, Moldova received EU candidate status, together with Ukraine, under the commitment of structural reforms.

Agreements
The Partnership and Cooperation Agreement (PCA) represents the legal framework for the Republic of Moldova–European Union relationship. The Agreement was signed on 28 November 1994 and entered into force on 1 July 1998 for the next 10 years. This arrangement provides for a basis of cooperation with the EU in the political, commercial, economic, legal, cultural and scientific areas.

In 2005, Moldova began implementing its first three-year action plan within the framework of the EU's European Neighbourhood Policy. This was the EU Moldova Action Plan, a political document that laid out the strategic objectives of cooperation between Moldova and the EU. Its implementation was intended to help fulfil the provisions in the PCA and to encourage and support Moldova's objective of further integration into European economic and social structures. Implementation of the Action Plan was meant to significantly advance the approximation of Moldovan legislation, norms and standards to those of the European Union.

Moldova and the EU began negotiating an Association Agreement (AA), including a Deep and Comprehensive Free Trade Area, to replace the PCA in January 2010. The AA was initialled in November 2013 at the Eastern Partnership summit, and signed on 27 June 2014. The parliament of Moldova ratified the agreement on 2 July 2014.

On 24 January 2011 Moldova officially received an "action plan" toward the establishment of a visa-free regime for short-stay travel from the EU's Internal Affairs Commissioner.  In November 2013, the Commission proposed that visa requirements for short-term visits be abolished for Moldovan citizens holding biometric passports, with Lithuanian Foreign Minister Linas Linkevičius suggesting the change could take place in early 2014. On 13 February 2014 the European Parliament's Civil Liberties, Justice, and Home Affairs Committee approved lifting the visa requirements, and the full parliament voted in favour on 27 February 2014. The European Parliament and Council gave their final consent to visa-free travel for Moldovan citizens on 3 April 2014, and the change become applicable on 28 April 2014.

Accession to the European Union 

The European Parliament passed a resolution in 2014 stating that "in accordance with Article 49 of the Treaty on European Union, Georgia, Moldova and Ukraine, as well as any other European country, have a European perspective and can apply for EU membership in compliance with the principles of democracy, respect for fundamental freedoms and human rights, minority rights and ensuring the rule of rights".

In April 2014, whilst visiting the Moldovan-Romanian border at Sculeni, Moldovan Prime Minister Iurie Leanca stated, "We have an ambitious target but I consider that we can reach it: doing everything possible for Moldova to become a full member of the European Union when Romania will hold the presidency of the EU in 2019".  In July 2017, Andrian Candu, Moldova's speaker of parliament, said that the country aimed to submit an application for membership by late 2018 or 2019.

Some political parties within both Moldova and Romania advocate merging the two countries. Such a scenario would incorporate the current territory of Moldova into Romania and thus into the EU, though the Transnistria conflict would still be an issue. With regard to Free Movement of Labour it could be argued that as far as individuals are concerned, Moldova is already a de facto member of the EU, since Moldovans will automatically gain a Romanian passport if they show that their ancestors were at one point Romanian (that is before the countries were split).

The integration process, however, has been hampered by many internal issues. The unresolved issue of the breakaway republic of Transnistria is a major barrier to any progress. Also, Moldova's autonomous region of Gagauzia held two referendums on 2 February 2014, where an overwhelming majority of voters rejected integration with the EU and opted for closer ties with Russia.

In the backdrop of the 2022 Russian invasion of Ukraine, President Maia Sandu signed a formal application for EU membership on 3 March 2022. On 7 March, the EU said it would formally assess Moldova's application. On 11 April, the Minister of Foreign Affairs and European Integration of Moldova Nicu Popescu received a questionnaire from the European Commission (EC) following a meeting with the European Commissioner for Neighbourhood and Enlargement Olivér Várhelyi as a result of Moldova's application for candidacy. Their response to the first part of the questionnaire was submitted back to the EC through the Delegation of the European Union to Moldova's head Janis Mazeiks by the Prime Minister of Moldova Natalia Gavrilița on 22 April, while the responses to the second part were submitted on 12 May 2022.

On 17 June 2022, the European Commission formally recommended that the European Council grant the Republic of Moldova the perspective to become a member of the European Union and candidate status for accession, with a number of conditions for the opening of accession negotiations. On 23 June, the European Council granted candidate status to Moldova.

Moldova was asked to improve the efficiency of its economy; reduce corruption; better enforce property rights; reduce the size of state-owned enterprises; improve energy efficiency; improve the labor market; comprehensively reform the judicial system and prosecutions, including filling vacancies; address problems identified by the OECD, Office for Democratic Institutions and Human Rights, and Venice Commission; improve investigations and prosecutions of corruption and implement recommendations of the National Anticorruption Centre; implement "de-oligarchisation"; reduce organized crime, improve money-laundering laws, and implement Financial Action Task Force standards; improve procurement, public administration, and delivery of public services; increase involvement of civil society in decision-making; reduce violence against women; and strengthen protections for gender equality and the human rights of vulnerable groups.

According to the Prime Minister of Moldova, Natalia Gavrilița, Moldova's accession negotiations with the EU can begin no earlier than the autumn of 2023.

Delegation

The Delegation of the European Union to Moldova was opened in Chişinău in October 2005, having the status of a diplomatic mission and officially represents the EU in the Republic of Moldova.

Delegations such as the one in Moldova exist all over the world. Altogether there are over 136.

The Delegation's mandate includes:
 Promotion of the political and economic relations between the countries of accreditation and the European Union;
 Monitoring the implementation of the Partnership and Cooperation Agreements (PCA) between the EU and Moldova;
 Informing the public of the development of the EU and to explain and defend individual EU policies;
 Participating in the implementation of the EU's external assistance programmes (mainly TACIS, FSP, ENP), focusing on the support of democratic development and good governance, regulatory reform and administrative capacity building, poverty reduction and economic growth.

Proposed CSDP mission

At a meeting of the EU Foreign Affairs Council on 20 February 2023, Moldovan foreign minister Nicu Popescu expressed an interest in the deployment of a Common Security and Defence Policy mission in Moldova. The Council of the European Union will explore this possibility.

Alliance For European Integration 
In August 2009, four Moldovan political parties agreed to create a governing coalition called the Alliance for European Integration. The Liberal Democratic Party, Liberal Party, Democratic Party, and Our Moldova committed themselves to achieving European integration and promoting a balanced, consistent and responsible foreign policy.
 Alliance for European Integration (2009-2013)
 Pro-European Coalition (2013-2015)
 Political Alliance for a European Moldova (2015)
 Alliance for European Integration III (2015-2016)

Public opinion 

On 2 February 2014, the Autonomous Territorial Unit of Gagauzia held two referendums on European integration.  In one, 98.4% voted in favour of joining the Customs Union of Belarus, Kazakhstan, and Russia, while in the second 97.2% opposed further integration with the EU. 98.9% also supported the proposition that Gagauzia could declare independence if Moldova unified with Romania. There is concern in Gagauzia that Moldova's integration with the EU could lead to such a unification with EU member Romania, which is unpopular in the autonomous region.

A poll in June 2018 found that 46% preferred that Moldova join the EU versus 36% that preferred to join the Eurasian Economic Union.

A March 2022 survey condected by Magenta Consulting found that, after president Maia Sandu announced that her government had officially submitted an application for membership of the European Union, 61% of Moldovans (40% 'totally', 21% 'rather') were in favour of EU membership, up from 52% before the start of the 2022 Russian invasion of Ukraine.

In May 2022, a poll in Moldova found that 56.1% supported EU membership.

Euroscepticism in Moldova
Moldova has several Eurosceptic parties including the left-wing Party of Socialists of the Republic of Moldova (PSRM) (1997–present), which has 22 seats in the 101-seat parliament, the conservative Șor Party (1998–present), which has 6 seats, and the left-wing Our Party (PN) (2014–present), which has no seats.

Moldova's foreign relations with EU member states

See also
Accession of Ukraine to the European Union
Association Trio
Moldova–European Union Association Agreement
Moldova–Romania relations
Eastern Europe
Potential enlargement of the European Union
Euronest Parliamentary Assembly
Energy Community
Georgia–European Union relations
Ukraine–European Union relations
INOGATE

References

External links
europa.eu foreign relations Moldova-EU
Delegation of the European Commission to Moldova site
www.mfa.md - Ministry of Foreign Affairs and European Integration of Moldova RM-EU relations page
EU-Moldova Negotiations: what is to be discussed, what could be achieved? document

 
Contemplated enlargements of the European Union
Third-country relations of the European Union